Craig Peter Wycinsky (born January 4, 1948, in Detroit, Michigan) is a former professional American football guard in the  National Football League for the Cleveland Browns in 1972. He played college football for Michigan State University.

References

1948 births
Living people
Players of American football from Detroit
American football offensive guards
Michigan State Spartans football players
Cleveland Browns players